General elections were held in Saint Kitts-Nevis-Anguilla on 30 July 1946. The Workers' League won all the elected seats, with no party running against them.

Electoral system
The Council had five elected members, with each island acting as a constituency; St Kitts returned three members, whilst Anguilla and Nevis returned one each. The right to vote was restricted to those over the age of 21 who had an income of at least £30 per annum, owned property with a value of at least £100, paid at least £12 of rent per year, or had paid at least 15 shillings of direct tax in the previous year.

Results

References

Saint Kitts
Elections in Saint Kitts and Nevis
Elections in Anguilla
General
Saint Kitts
Saint Kitts